Jehangira is a town in the Khyber-Pakhtunkhwa province of Pakistan.

Overview and history 
According to 1870 land management records from when the area was under the control of the khushal khan khattak, Jehangir Khan founded Jehangira in 1681. Originally, the place was known as Jehangira Awan but over time came to be known by the current name of Jehangira.

In 1818, during the Ranjit Singh invasion of Peshawar valley, Jehangira was badly damaged by the Sikhs. The Sikhs built an army post inside Jehangira in order to control the area and launched a boat service across the river to connect it with Peshawar.

Under British colonialism, the residents built a checkpoint and a police station on the bank of Kabul River as well as a floating bridge over the river. After the independence of Pakistan in 1947, the local government has used the former British checkpoint as a police station.

In 1970, a reinforced hollow-core concrete bridge was constructed over the river, now known as Jehangira bridge. During a period of flooding in July 2010, the bridge was submerged under water for several hours.

As time passed, the village's population increased and it started to grown into adjacent populated areas. Many new markets and industries emerged in the area and some people started to refer to the entire municipal area as "Jehangira town".

Jehangira was originally divided into two municipal governments under two different districts: Eastern Jehangira (under the Swabi district) and Western Jehangira (under the Nowshera District). However, on July 3, 2005, the government of the North-West Frontier Province announced the merger of these municipal governments.

Boundaries
The mountains of Khawri behind the Jehangira Railway station form the western boundary of Jehangira. The southern shore of the Indus river is the border with Punjab, Pakistan. To the east are Tordhair town and Ala Dher Village and on the northern border are the villages of Mian-Esa and Jalbai.

Climate
The climate of Jehangira is similar to that of Islamabad, although sometimes more humid due to the Kabul and Indus Rivers. In the summer, the chain of mountains and desolate areas to the northwest can cause hot and dusty winds.

People and cultures
Many inhabitants of Jehangira are members of various Pashtoon clans that migrated from different parts of Pakistan and Afghanistan. Some locations of note within Jehangira:

 Jehangira village (Swabi district): This place is also known as Pushtoon's village because of the usage of the Pushto language - the majority of the population has been Pashtoon since 1681. The hamlet has a population of 42 thousand and is led by Ch. Imdad Ullah. In the 2005 election, Muhammad Ismail Khan was elected as Nazim of the Union council.
Qazi Hidayat ur rehman Is Member of Dispute Resolution Council (DRC) Tehsil And district.
 Mardgan village (Swabi district): This area was settled by Sikh-Raj in 1818 for the purpose of providing boating services on the Kabul River - "Mardgan" is a Pushto word that means "boatmen" or "sailors". The majority of the people of this village area speak Hindko but not all of them are sailors, and some Pushtoon families live here as well.
 New hamlets (Swabi district): There are some recently populated areas such as Mera, Kodray, Hayatabad, New-Nehr, ismail abad,  Marab, Budai-Kamar, Garha, Karkhana, Zorh Nehr, Shekh baba, and Mia-Esa road.
 Dubandi Bazaar (Nowshera district): This place is located near the junction of the Swabi road with the historical highway Jurnaily Road. Originally, there were only a few makeshift stores for food and tea at the bus stop and the railway station of Jehangira. Gradually, as the population grew, Dubandi became a real bazaar and a famous shopping center in the area.
 Dherri Khattak (Nowshera district): Located in the north near the Jehangira railway station, this area is famous for a popular volleyball game held there. The majority of Dehri Khattak speaks Hindko.
 Qazi-an: A notable and respected family of Jehangira Swabi, known as Qazi-an by the locals. The family has been here for more than 500 years. The language spoken by them Is Pashto.
During British rule in India 17th century the Qazi-an were very awarded by the British due to there justice in not just jehangira but throughout swabi. The Family has many affiliation with different political parties. Qazi Hidayat ur rehman Is Member of Dispute Resolution Council (DRC) Tehsil And district.

Mausoleums and cemeteries
About  of the area consists of graveyards, mostly at the eastern part of town. Some graves of note:

 The tomb of Badu Baba, in the north-east
 The tomb of Lakai Bebyane, in the south
 The tomb of Sheikh Baba, on the eastern bank of Kabul river
 Ghara Qabristan 
 Adam Baba Muqbara

An urs is celebrated annually on the 12th of Rabi Alawal on his Mazzar.

Further reading 
 Geography of Khyber-Pakhtunkhwa, Govt: of Khyber-Pakhtunkhwa. Department of Geography & History (2008) Mahekma e Auqaf.

References

Populated places in Swabi District
Union Councils of Swabi District
Populated places in Nowshera District